WaKeeney is a city in and the county seat of Trego County, Kansas, United States.  As of the 2020 census, the population of the city was 1,799.

History
James Keeney, a land speculator in Chicago, purchased land at the site of modern-day WaKeeney from the Kansas Pacific Railway in 1877. He and business partner Albert Warren formed Warren, Keeney, & Co., surveyed and plotted the site in 1878, and established a colony there in 1879. They named the colony WaKeeney, a portmanteau of their surnames, and billed it as "The Queen City of the High Plains", advertising and holding celebrations to attract settlers. The colony grew rapidly, but crop failures drove settlers to leave in 1880 as quickly as they had come. By 1882, all that was left were "five poorly patronized retail stores". Years later, Volga Germans began settling the area.

WaKeeney became the county seat in June 1879 and was incorporated as a city in 1880.

Geography
WaKeeney is located at  (39.024467, -99.881972) at an elevation of 2,447 feet (746 m).

A small tributary of Big Creek flows south from near the center of the city.

Climate
WaKeeney has a humid continental climate (Köppen Dfa), experiencing hot, humid summers and cold, dry winters. The average temperature is 52.8 °F (11 °C), and the average yearly precipitation is 23.6 inches (600 mm). Snowfall averages 25.2 inches (640 mm) per year. On average, January is the coolest month, and July is both the warmest month and the wettest month. The hottest temperature recorded in WaKeeney was 110 °F (43 °C) in 1980; the coldest temperature recorded was -25 °F (-32 °C) in 1989.

Demographics

2010 census
As of the census of 2010, there were 1,862 people, 864 households, and 500 families residing in the city. The racial makeup of the city was 96.9% White, 0.5% African American, 0.3% Native American, 0.3% Asian, 0.1% Pacific Islander, 0.9% from other races, and 1.0% from two or more races. Hispanic or Latino of any race were 1.6% of the population.

There were 864 households, of which 23.0% had children under the age of 18 living with them, 47.6% were married couples living together, 7.3% had a female householder with no husband present, 3.0% had a male householder with no wife present, and 42.1% were non-families. 36.8% of all households were made up of individuals, and 19.9% had someone living alone who was 65 years of age or older. The average household size was 2.09 and the average family size was 2.73.

The median age in the city was 48.8 years. 20% of residents were under the age of 18; 5.6% were between the ages of 18 and 24; 18.9% were from 25 to 44; 30.3% were from 45 to 64; and 25.3% were 65 years of age or older. The gender makeup of the city was 48.5% male and 51.5% female.

2000 census
As of the census of 2000, there were 1,924 people, 882 households, and 539 families residing in the city. The racial makeup of the city was 97.14% White, 0.05% African American, 0.47% Native American, 0.78% Asian, 0.10% Pacific Islander, and 1.46% from two or more races. Hispanic or Latino of any race were 0.57% of the population.

There were 882 households, out of which 25.4% had children under the age of 18 living with them, 51.0% were married couples living together, 8.2% had a female householder with no husband present, and 38.8% were non-families. 36.6% of all households were made up of individuals, and 21.8% had someone living alone who was 65 years of age or older. The average household size was 2.14 and the average family size was 2.80.

In the city, the population was spread out, with 21.9% under the age of 18, 5.9% from 18 to 24, 23.5% from 25 to 44, 21.9% from 45 to 64, and 26.7% who were 65 years of age or older. The median age was 44 years. For every 100 females, there were 83.6 males. For every 100 females age 18 and over, there were 79.7 males.

The median income for a household in the city was $28,945, and the median income for a family was $40,547. Males had a median income of $26,292 versus $16,435 for females. The per capita income for the city was $17,596. About 6.3% of families and 8.8% of the population were below the poverty line, including 10.3% of those under age 18 and 10.4% of those age 65 or over.

Education
USD 208 provides public primary and secondary education with two schools in WaKeeney:  Trego Grade School (Grades Pre-K-8) and Trego Community High School (9-12).

The Trego Golden Eagles won the Kansas State High School boys class 2A Track & Field championship in 1977 and the boys class 3A Track & Field championship in 1997.

Infrastructure

Transportation
Interstate 70 and U.S. Route 40 run concurrently southeast-northwest immediately south of WaKeeney, intersecting U.S. Route 283 which runs north–south through the city. U.S. 283 runs east–west for one mile in downtown WaKeeney, concurrent with U.S. Route 40 Business and the old alignment of U.S. 40.

Trego WaKeeney Airport is located on the west side of U.S. 283 immediately south of I-70. Publicly owned, it has one concrete runway and is used for general aviation.

Union Pacific Railroad operates one freight rail line, the Kansas Pacific (KP) line, through WaKeeney. It runs east–west through the city.

Media
The local newspaper published in WaKeeney is the weekly Western Kansas World.

K231BG, a translator of radio station KJIL in Copeland, Kansas, broadcasts from WaKeeney on 94.1 FM playing a Contemporary Christian format.

WaKeeney is in the Wichita-Hutchinson, Kansas television market.

Culture

Events
Since 1950, WaKeeney has hosted an ornate civic Christmas lighting display, which now includes over 6,000 lights and a 35-foot man-made Christmas tree in the center of town. The tree is ceremonially lit the Saturday night after Thanksgiving through New Years.

Points of interest
The train depot, built in 1879 with Saline River and Big Creek limestone, was the first major building in the town.  It was inaugurated on July 4 of that year, with officials from Warren, Keeney and the Kansas governor in attendance. Union Pacific later acquired the depot and used it until the 1930s. The Opera House was the next major building, completed in 1884 with ceiling murals, a Rochester electric brass chandelier, and seating for 400. It was destroyed by fire the following year.

The Trego County Courthouse, constructed of Trego County hard stone and Manhattan stone, was designed by Topeka architect George R. Ropes in the Queen Anne style, with a 100-ft cupola and European tin roof which lasted until 1952. The courthouse is still in use, although the basement jail, with unusual flat bars, was closed in 1976.  The building appeared in several scenes in the 1974 film Paper Moon.

Notable people

Notable individuals who were born in and/or have lived in WaKeeney include:
Charles Harris Garrigues (1903-1974), journalist
Steve Gotsche (1961- ), PGA Tour and Nationwide Tour golfer
Andrew J. Harlan (1815-1907), U.S. Representative from Indiana
Frank Mechau (1904-1946), painter
Mike Schreiner (1969- ), Leader of Ontario Green Party; Member of the Ontario Legislative Assembly
Orrin Upshaw (1874-1937), U.S. Olympic tug of war athlete

References

Further reading

External links

 City of WaKeeney
 WaKeeney - Directory of Public Officials
 USD 208, local school district
 History of WaKeeney
 WaKeeney city map, KDOT

Cities in Trego County, Kansas
Cities in Kansas
County seats in Kansas
Populated places established in 1879
1879 establishments in Kansas